Eulogia is a monotypic snout moth genus described by Carl Heinrich in 1956. Its only species is Eulogia ochrifrontella, the broad-banded eulogia moth, described by Philipp Christoph Zeller in 1875. It is found in most of North America, including British Columbia, Florida, Illinois, Maine, Manitoba, Massachusetts, Minnesota, New Jersey, Oklahoma, Ontario, Pennsylvania, Tennessee, Virginia and Washington.

The wingspan is 11–15 mm. The inner half and subterminal area of the forewings is reddish brown or copper colored. The hindwings are smoky gray. Adults are on wing in June and July.

The larvae feed on Carya illinoinensis, Quercus and Malus species and possibly Amelanchier alnifolia.

References

External links

Moths described in 1875
Phycitinae
Monotypic moth genera
Moths of North America